Mahmoud Abdel Aziz (born 27 July 1990) is an Egyptian professional footballer who plays as a midfielder for Zamalek SC. In May 2018, he was named in Egypt’s preliminary squad for the 2018 FIFA World Cup in Russia.

Honours
Zamalek SC

Egyptian Premier League 2020-21
 Egypt Cup: 2018, 2019
Egyptian Super Cup: 2019–20
 Saudi-Egyptian Super Cup: 2018
 CAF Confederation Cup : 2018–19
 CAF Super Cup: 2020

References

External links

1990 births
Living people
Egyptian footballers
Egyptian Premier League players
Zamalek SC players
Association football midfielders
Egypt international footballers